House of Blackmail is a 1953 British drama film directed by Maurice Elvey and starring Mary Germaine, William Sylvester and Alexander Gauge. Its plot follows a soldier and his girlfriend, who become mixed up with a blackmailer.

Cast
 Mary Germaine ...  Carol Blane
 William Sylvester ...  Jimmy
 Alexander Gauge ...  Markham
 John Arnatt ...  Pete Carter
 Denis Shaw ...  Bassett
 Ingeborg von Kusserow ...  Emma
 Patricia Owens ...  Joan
 C. Denier Warren ...  Jock
 Hugo Schuster ...  Dr. Welich
 Barry Wynne ...  Billy Blane

Critical reception
The Radio Times wrote, "not one of his (Maurice Elvey's) best efforts. We could do with more surprises, but the pace is unrelenting and there are typically solid performances from Mary Germaine, William Sylvester and John Arnatt"; and TV Guide called it "ordinary but fast paced."

References

External links

1953 films
1953 drama films
1950s English-language films
Films directed by Maurice Elvey
British drama films
British black-and-white films
1950s British films